HWS may refer to:
 Hatif Welfare Society
 Hay–Wells syndrome
 Health web science
 Hobart and William Smith Colleges
 Hollywood (programming language)
 Hong Wen School, in Singapore
 Hypersonic Weapon System
 Holographic Weapon Sight